Josip Čorak (born 14 June 1943) is a retired wrestler from Croatia. Competing as a senior in the 90 kg Greco-Roman division he won gold medals at the 1969 European Championships and 1967 Mediterranean Games and a silver medal at the 1972 Olympics. Čorak later won a record of 11 world titles in Greco-Roman and freestyle wrestling in the masters category.

References

External links
 

1943 births
Living people
Sportspeople from Gospić
Croatian male sport wrestlers
Olympic wrestlers of Yugoslavia
Wrestlers at the 1972 Summer Olympics
Yugoslav male sport wrestlers
Olympic silver medalists for Yugoslavia
Olympic medalists in wrestling
Medalists at the 1972 Summer Olympics
Mediterranean Games gold medalists for Yugoslavia
Mediterranean Games silver medalists for Yugoslavia
Competitors at the 1967 Mediterranean Games
Competitors at the 1971 Mediterranean Games
Mediterranean Games medalists in wrestling
European Wrestling Championships medalists